George Dean Washington Moss III (born September 23, 1982) is an American Christian hip hop musician and founder of clothing line Oxen Apparel. He was a member of Christian hip hop group, UN1ON. His first studio album, All or Nothing, was released by Dreamlight Entertainment, in 2008, with the singles, "Whoa!" and "Transparent". The subsequent studio album, It's Time, was released in 2012, from Dreamlight Entertainment. He released, a single, "Set It Off", in 2015, featuring Steven Malcolm.

Early life
Moss was born George Dean Washington Moss III on September 23, 1982, in the city of Grand Rapids, Michigan.

Music career
Moss was a member in the Christian hip hop group, UN1ON, in the early 2000s. He used to go on tours with KJ-52, where this allowed him to get exposure for his music. His first studio album, All or Nothing, was released by Dreamlight Entertainment, in 2008, where this contained the radio singles, "Whoa!" and "Transparent". The next single, a non-album one, "Loud", was released from Dreamlight Records, in 2011. He released, the subsequent studio album, It's Time, on October 16, 2012, with Dreamlight Entertainment. His next single, "Down for You", was released from Dreamlight Entertainment, in 2012, where it was a non-album song. The single, "Set It Off", was released in 2015, by Dreamlight Entertainment.

Personal life
Moss met his future wife, Michelle Cummings, at a concert he was doing at her church, the two were engaged around Valentine's Day 2014, and married in a ceremony the subsequent month in Grand Rapids, Michigan. They have a child together.

Discography
 All or Nothing (2008, Dreamlight)
 It's Time (2012, Dreamlight)
Singles

References

External links
 Official website

1982 births
Living people
African-American male rappers
African-American Christians
Musicians from Michigan
Performers of Christian hip hop music
Rappers from Michigan
21st-century American rappers
21st-century American male musicians
21st-century African-American musicians
20th-century African-American people